Holy Cross Church is a church on Cromer Street in the St Pancras area of the London Borough of Camden. It was built 1887–88 by Joseph Peacock.

History
The church began as a district chapelry in 1876 before becoming a parish in 1888. Its parish was merged with that of St.Jude Gray's Inn Road (demolished 1936) in 1935 and that of St Peter's Regent Square in 1954 (damaged in the Blitz and demolished in 1954). In 1988 its Crypt Centre was set up to work for the homeless, and the church is still in use under its parish priest Christopher Cawrse.

The church was designated a Grade II listed building on 14 May 1974. The painting Santa Maria Magdalena by Reginald Gray hangs in the small chapel.

Notable clergy
 Hope Patten, served his curacy here in the 1910s

References

External links
Official page
Page at GenUKI

Churches in the London Borough of Camden
Grade II listed churches in London
Grade II listed buildings in the London Borough of Camden
Anglo-Catholic church buildings in the London Borough of Camden